Alda Ferreira Pires Barreto de Lara Albuquerque, known as Alda Lara (9 June 1930, Benguela, Angola – 30 January 1962, Cambambe, Angola) was a Portuguese-language Angolan poet.

Biography
Alda Lara was born on 9 June 1930 in Benguela, Angola. She came from a wealthy family and received a Christian education, which gave her a spirit of liberalism according to one commentator. Her brother was the noted poet Ernesto Lara Filho. Lara attended a women's school in Sá da Bandeira (now Lubango) before moving to Portugal to finisher her secondary schooling. She attended Lisbon University and resided at the Casa dos Estudantes do Imperio (House of the Students of the Empire). She had an active student life and began her writing career by publishing poetry in the literary journal Mensagem, a publication specifically for Africans. Lara later attended the University of Coimbra and earned a degree in medicine.

Lara wrote for several newspapers and magazines such as the Jornal de Benguela, the Jornal de Angola, and the ABC e Ciência. She married the Mozambican-Portuguese writer Orlando Albuquerque and gave birth to four children. After living in Portugal for 13 years, Lara moved back to Angola in 1961. However, her return would be short-lived, as she died on 30 January 1962 in Cambambe. Her husband set about publishing her collected works after her death, including Poemas in 1966 and Tempo de Chuva in 1973. Lara's poems and short stories mostly deal with themes of motherhood and children as well as liberty and justice. Much of her poetry reflect a dissatisfaction with the colonial status quo.

The Alda Lara Prize (in Portuguese, Prémio Alda Lara) was established in her honour by the city of Lubango. Paulo de Carvalho, a famed Portuguese singer, who has had a strong artistic career, recorded "Preludio/Mãe Negra", a poem written by Alda Lara. Movimento, the second album of Aline Frazão released in 2013, features a poem by Lara set to music.

Books (posthumous)
 Poemas (1966)
 Tempo da Chuva (1973)
 Poesia (1979)
 Poemas (1984) (her collected poems)

References

1930 births
1962 deaths
People from Benguela
Angolan people of Portuguese descent
Colonial people in Angola
20th-century Portuguese writers
Angolan women poets
20th-century Angolan poets
20th-century Portuguese women writers
Portuguese-language writers